Hugo Santana Páez (born September 5, 1967) is a Mexican football manager and former player.

References

Footballers from Mexico City
1967 births
Living people
Atlético Celaya footballers
Deportivo Toluca F.C. players
Mexican footballers
Liga MX players
Mexican football managers
Association football midfielders
Liga MX Femenil managers